Anatoly Yuryevich Ravikovich (December 24, 1936 – April 8, 2012) was a Soviet and Russian actor. He graduated from the Ostrovsky Leningrad Theatre Institute (later LGITMiK) in 1958, and started to work at the Komsomolsk-on-Amur drama theater. In 1962 Ravikovich returned to Leningrad and started to work at the Lensovet Theatre. In 1982 he appeared in Mikhail Kozakov's comedy film The Pokrovsky Gate. He was named a People's Artist of Russia in 1988. 

Ravikovich died on April 8, 2012 in Saint Petersburg. He is survived by his wife Irina Mazurkevich, also a People's Artist of Russia.

Selected filmography
 Agony (1974)  as supplicant
 The Pokrovsky Gate (1982)  as Lev Yevgenevich Khobotov
 The Blonde Around the Corner (1984)  as store clerk
 Musketeers Twenty Years After (1992)  as Cardinal Mazarin
 The Secret of Queen Anne or Musketeers Thirty Years After (1993)  as Cardinal Mazarin
 The Return of the Musketeers, or The Treasures of Cardinal Mazarin (2009)  as Cardinal Mazarin

References

External links

1936 births
2012 deaths
Russian male film actors
Russian male stage actors
Soviet male film actors
Deaths from cancer in Russia
Recipients of the Order of Honour (Russia)
Honored Artists of the RSFSR
People's Artists of the RSFSR
Russian State Institute of Performing Arts alumni
Male  actors from Saint Petersburg